18th Abduction is the eighteenth novel in the Women's Murder Club novel series by James Patterson and Maxine Paetro.

Plot
San Francisco Police Sergeant Lindsay Boxer is the main character of this book. It has two plots. The main plot involves three schoolteachers, who suddenly vanish after a night out after school. One turns up murdered with no clues as to who killed her or why or where the other two teachers are. The second plot involves Lindsay's husband, Joe Molinari. A woman who survived a deadly attack on her village in another country many years before comes to Joe with a story that she has seen a war criminal who was involved in this attack in San Francisco. Both Lindsay and Joe look very hard for any clues they can find in both these cases.

Reviews
A positive review came from the Times of India. The review said, "With two intriguing storylines running side by side, the book is hard to put down and will be over faster than the reader anticipated." Book Reporter also liked this book, saying, "Longtime readers of the Women’s Murder Club know what to expect with each installment, and this latest entry more than delivers on all counts."

This book was number one on The New York Times list of best sellers for Combined Print & E-Book Fiction for the week of May 19, 2019.

References

Notes

2019 American novels
Women's Murder Club (novel series)
Little, Brown and Company books
Novels set in San Francisco
Collaborative novels